Abderrachid Tabbi (born 31 December 1960) is the Algerian Minister of Justice and Keeper of the Seals. He was appointed as minister on 8 September 2021.

Education 
Tabbi holds a Diploma (1983) from the École nationale d'administration.

References 

1960 births
Living people
21st-century Algerian politicians
Justice ministers of Algeria
Government ministers of Algeria
Algerian politicians